Jukka Heinikainen (born 22 July 1972) is a Finnish former racing cyclist. He won the Finnish national road race title in 2002. He also competed in the pursuit event at the 1996 Summer Olympics.

References

External links
 

1972 births
Living people
People from Kuusankoski
Finnish male cyclists
Olympic cyclists of Finland
Cyclists at the 1996 Summer Olympics
Sportspeople from Kymenlaakso